General David Victor Belly de Bussy (19 March 1768 in Beaurieux – 2 January 1848) was a French officer during the Napoleonic Wars.

Notes

References

1768 births
1848 deaths